S. V. Kumaraswamy (born 17 February 1918) was an Indian cricket umpire. He stood in one Test match, India vs. England, in 1961.

See also
 List of Test cricket umpires
 English cricket team in India in 1961–62

References

1918 births
Possibly living people
Place of birth missing
Indian Test cricket umpires